Bensham is a suburban area in the Metropolitan Borough of Gateshead. The area consists mainly of residential properties, with a range of predominantly terraced housing, built between the late 1890s and the 1980s.

Community
Like nearby Saltwell, the area is home to a sizeable community of Orthodox Haredi Jews. The Gateshead Talmudical College, founded in 1929, is one of the largest yeshiva for Jewish education in Europe. The area has affectionately earned the nickname "Little Jerusalem" by locals. The most recent chief rabbi, Shraga Feivel Zimmerman, served between 2008 and 2020.
The roof of a flat in Bensham was torn off by extreme winds during storm Malik as it battered the North East of England in January 2022.

Demography
The data below shows that 51.0% of the population in the Lobley Hill and Bensham electoral ward are male, and 49.0% are female. This compares similarly with both the average in the Metropolitan Borough of Gateshead, as well as the national average.

A total of 6.1% of the population were from a black, Asian and minority ethnic (BAME) group in Lobley Hill and Bensham. This figure is higher than that of the average in Gateshead , but lower than the national average .

Data from the Office for National Statistics found that the average life expectancy in the Lobley Hill and Bensham electoral ward is 75.0 years for men, and 80.3 years for women. These statistics compare less than favourably for both men and women, when compared to the average life expectancy in the North East of England, of 77.4 and 81.4 years, for men and women respectively.

A total of 55.9% of households in Lobley Hill and Bensham have access to at least one car. This figure is significantly lower than both the average in Gateshead , as well as the national average .

Governance
Lobley Hill and Bensham is a local council ward in the Metropolitan Borough of Gateshead.

, the ward is served by three councillors: Catherine Donovan, Eileen McMaster and Kevin Dodds.

The village is located within the parliamentary constituency of Gateshead, and is served by Labour Party Member of Parliament (MP), Ian Mearns.

Transport

Air 

Bus 
Bensham Road is a well-served bus corridor, providing a regular service to Gateshead and Newcastle upon Tyne.

Rail 
The nearest National Rail station is Newcastle, which is located on the East Coast Main Line. A former station on the East Coast Main Line served the area between 1868 and 1954.

Road 
Bensham is located near to the A1 and A167. By road, Gateshead can be reached in around 5 minutes, Newcastle upon Tyne in 10 minutes, and Newcastle International Airport in 20 minutes.

See also
 Deckham
 Lobley Hill
 Saltwell
 Saltwell Park

References

Gateshead
Orthodox Jewish communities
Populated places in Tyne and Wear